Britney & Kevin: Chaotic is the second extended play (EP) by American singer Britney Spears. It was released on September 21, 2005, by Jive Records, to accompany the DVD release for Spears' UPN reality television series Britney and Kevin: Chaotic (2005). The EP featured three songs–"Chaotic", "Someday (I Will Understand)" and "Mona Lisa".

Background and development
In July 2004, Spears announced her engagement to American dancer Kevin Federline, whom she had met three months before. The romance received intense attention from the media, since Federline had recently broken up with actress Shar Jackson, who was still pregnant with their second child at the time. The initial stages of their relationship were chronicled in Spears's first reality show Britney and Kevin: Chaotic, which aired on UPN in the spring of 2005. They held a wedding ceremony on September 18, 2004, but were not legally married until three weeks later on October 6 due to a delay finalizing the couple's prenuptial agreement. In October, Spears announced she would be taking a career break to start a family.

On December 30, Spears made a surprise appearance at the Los Angeles radio station KIIS-FM to premiere a rough mix of a new mid-tempo track "Mona Lisa". Spears had recorded the song live with her band during The Onyx Hotel Tour. She dedicated the song to all the "legends and icons out there". The lyrics lament the fall of Mona Lisa, calling her "unforgettable" and "unpredictable", and caution listeners not to have a "breakdown". She also revealed she wanted the song to be the lead single single from her fifth studio album, tentatively titled The Original Doll and hoped to release the album "probably before summertime [2005], or maybe a little sooner than that". In January 2005, Spears posted another letter on her website, saying, 
 
I think I should rephrase myself from my previous letters when I was talking about taking a 'break'. What I meant was I am taking a break from being told what to do. ... It's cool when you look at someone and don't know whether they are at work or play since it's all the same to them. The things I've been doing for work lately have been so much fun, because it's not like work to me anymore. I've been even more 'hands on' in my management and the business side of things, and I feel more in control than ever.

A representative for Jive Records stated that although Spears was working in the studio, "no album is scheduled at the moment" and that there were no plans to service "Mona Lisa" to radio.

Recording and production
"Mona Lisa", which was written by Spears, Teddy Campbell and David Kochanski, was reworked to be included on Britney & Kevin: Chaotic, having originally been recorded during Spears' The Onyx Hotel Tour in 2004. Spears composed "Someday (I Will Understand)" on the piano at her house, two weeks before she learned of her pregnancy with her first child, Sean Preston. She explained the song came "like a prophecy... when you're pregnant, you're empowered". Guy Sigsworth produced "Someday (I Will Understand)", and also co-wrote "Over to You Now" with Imogen Heap, Robyn and Alexander Kronlund; the latter was included as a bonus track on the UK and Japanese editions of the EP, replacing the originally-selected track "And Then We Kiss".

Release
Britney & Kevin: Chaotic was released both as a bonus CD to Britney & Kevin: Chaotic... the DVD & More and as a standalone EP. In Japan, the EP and the DVD were released separately; the EP was titled Someday (I Will Understand) and was released on September 21, 2005, while the DVD was released on October 26. In the United States, the EP was released for digital download simultaneously with the DVD+CD set on September 27, by Jive Records.

Singles
"Someday (I Will Understand)" was released as the only single from Britney & Kevin: Chaotic in Europe on August 18, 2005. The song reached the top ten in Denmark, Sweden, Switzerland and Greece and also charted in a number of European countries. The black-and-white music video premiered on the finale of Britney & Kevin: Chaotic. Directed by Michael Haussman, it features Spears as a pregnant woman and portrays a transformation of her character. A remixed version of the song was included on Spears' first remix album B in the Mix: The Remixes in November.

Track listing

Personnel
Credits for Britney & Kevin: Chaotic are adapted from AllMusic.

 Stephanie Alexander – background vocals
 Michelle Bell – background vocals
 Gromyko Collins – background vocals
 Fausto Cuevas – percussion
 Dan Dymtrow – video production
 Per Eklund – drums
 Kevin Federline – executive video production
 Niklas Flyckt – drum engineering, mixing
 Emma Holmgren – background vocals
 Henrik Jonback – bass, guitar
 Grant "Mr. Blues" Jones – video editing
 William Knight – video editing
 Thomas Lindberg – bass
 Steve Lunt – A&R, arrangement
 Ben Mauro – guitar
 Charles McCrorey – engineering assistance
 Sean McGhee – engineering, mixing, programming
 Billy Murphy – video editing
 Jonas Ostman – engineering assistance
 Francesco Perlangeli – assistance
 Guy Sigsworth – instrumentation, production
 Tom Soares – engineering
 Britney Spears – executive video production, piano, video direction, vocals
 Steven Wolf – drums
 Bille Woodruff – video direction

Release history

See also
 Britney and Kevin: Chaotic
 Britney Spears discography

Notes

References

Bibliography

External links
 Official website

2005 EPs
Albums produced by Bloodshy & Avant
Albums produced by Guy Sigsworth
Britney Spears EPs
Jive Records EPs